Lai Ngao is a village and tambon (subdistrict) of Wiang Kaen District, in Chiang Rai Province, Thailand. In 2005 it had a population of 3,490 people. The tambon contains six villages.

References

Tambon of Chiang Rai province
Populated places in Chiang Rai province